Elisha Burr Maynard (November 21, 1842 – May 28, 1906) was an American attorney and politician who served on the city council and as Mayor of Springfield, Massachusetts and as an associate justice of the Massachusetts Superior Court.

References

1842 births
1906 deaths
Springfield, Massachusetts City Council members
Democratic Party members of the Massachusetts House of Representatives
Mayors of Springfield, Massachusetts
People from Wilbraham, Massachusetts
19th-century American politicians